The 2013–14 Eastern Illinois Panthers men's basketball team represented Eastern Illinois University during the 2013–14 NCAA Division I men's basketball season. The Panthers, led by second year head coach Jay Spoonhour, played their home games at Lantz Arena and were members of the West Division of the Ohio Valley Conference. They finished the season 11–19, 7–9 in OVC play to finish in a tie for third place in the West Division. They lost in the first round of the Ohio Valley tournament to Southeast Missouri State.

Roster

Schedule

|-
!colspan=9 style="background:#0000FF; color:#808080;"| Exhibition

|-
!colspan=9 style="background:#0000FF; color:#808080;"| Regular season

|-
!colspan=9 style="background:#0000FF; color:#808080;"| 2014 Ohio Valley Conference tournament

References

Eastern Illinois Panthers men's basketball seasons
Eastern Illinois